Thomas Edward Hulce (born December 6, 1953) is an American actor and theatre producer. He is best known for his portrayal of Wolfgang Amadeus Mozart in the Academy Award-winning film Amadeus (1984), as well as the roles of Larry "Pinto" Kroger in Animal House (1978), Larry Buckman in Parenthood (1989), and Quasimodo in Disney's animated film The Hunchback of Notre Dame (1996). Awards include an Emmy Award for The Heidi Chronicles, a Tony Award for Spring Awakening, an Academy Award nomination for Best Actor for Amadeus, and four Golden Globe nominations.

He retired from acting in the mid-1990s to focus on stage directing and producing. In 2007, he won the Tony Award for Best Musical as a lead producer of Spring Awakening.

Early life
Thomas Edward Hulce was born on December 6, 1953 in Detroit, Michigan (some sources incorrectly cite his birthplace as Whitewater, Wisconsin). The youngest of four children, he was raised in Plymouth, Michigan. His mother, the former Joanna Winkleman, sang briefly with Phil Spitalny's All-Girl Orchestra, and his father, Raymond Albert Hulce, worked for the Ford Motor Company. As a child, he wanted to be a singer, but he switched to acting after his voice changed in his teenage years. He left home at the age of 15 and attended Interlochen Arts Academy and the North Carolina School of the Arts, leaving a year before finishing his BFA. He graduated with a BA from Beloit College in Wisconsin.

Acting career
Hulce debuted as an actor in 1975, playing opposite Anthony Hopkins in Equus on Broadway. Throughout the rest of the 1970s and the early 1980s, he worked primarily as a theater actor, taking occasional parts in movies. His first film role was in the James Dean-influenced film September 30, 1955 in 1977. His next movie role was as freshman student Lawrence "Pinto" Kroger in the classic comedy Animal House (1978). In 1983, he played a gunshot victim in the television show St. Elsewhere.

In the early 1980s, Hulce was chosen over intense competition (including David Bowie, Mikhail Baryshnikov, Mark Hamill, and Kenneth Branagh) to play the role of Mozart in director Miloš Forman's film version of Peter Shaffer's play Amadeus. In 1985, he was nominated for an Academy Award for Best Actor for his performance, losing to his co-star, F. Murray Abraham. In his acceptance speech, Abraham paid tribute to his co-star, saying, "There's only one thing missing for me tonight, and that is to have Tom Hulce standing by my side."

In 1989, he received his second Best Actor Golden Globe Award nomination for a critically acclaimed performance as an intellectually-challenged garbage-collector in the 1988 movie Dominick and Eugene. He played supporting roles in Parenthood (1989), Fearless (1993) and Mary Shelley's Frankenstein (1994). In 1988, he played the title part in the British–Dutch movie Shadow Man, directed by the Polish director Piotr Andrejew.

In 1990, he was nominated for his first Emmy Award for his performance as the 1960s civil rights activist Michael Schwerner in the 1990 TV-movie Murder in Mississippi. He starred as Joseph Stalin's projectionist in Russian director Andrei Konchalovsky's 1991 film The Inner Circle. In 1996, he won an Emmy Award for his role as a pediatrician in a television-movie version of the Wendy Wasserstein play The Heidi Chronicles, starring Jamie Lee Curtis. Also that year, he was cast in Disney's animated film adaptation of The Hunchback of Notre Dame, providing the speaking and singing voice of the protagonist Quasimodo. Although Hulce largely retired from acting in the mid-1990s, he had bit parts in the movies Stranger Than Fiction (2006) and Jumper (2008).

Hulce remained active in theater throughout his entire acting career. In addition to Equus, he appeared in Broadway productions of A Memory of Two Mondays and A Few Good Men, for which he was a Tony Award nominee in 1990. In the mid-1980s, he appeared in two different productions of playwright Larry Kramer's early AIDS-era drama The Normal Heart. In 1992, he starred in a Shakespeare Theatre Company production of Hamlet. His regional theatre credits include Eastern Standard at the Seattle Repertory Theatre and Nothing Sacred at the Mark Taper Forum, both in 1988.

Career as producer
Among Hulce's major projects are the six-hour, two-evening stage adaptation of John Irving's The Cider House Rules; and Talking Heads, a festival of Alan Bennett's one-man plays that won six Obie Awards, a Drama Desk Award, a special Outer Critics Circle Award, and a New York Drama Critics' Circle Award for Best Foreign Play. He also headed 10 Million Miles, a musical project by Keith Bunin and Grammy Award-nominated singer-songwriter Patty Griffin, that premiered in Spring 2007 at the Atlantic Theater Company.

Hulce was a lead producer of the Broadway hit Spring Awakening, which won eight Tony Awards in 2007, including one for Best Musical. He is also a lead producer of the stage adaptation of the Green Day album American Idiot. The musical had its world premiere in Berkeley, California, at the Berkeley Repertory Theatre in 2009 and opened on Broadway in April 2010. In 2017 he began work as a producer on the musical Ain't Too Proud, which received 11 Tony Award nominations in 2019. He also produced the 2004 movie A Home at the End of the World, based upon Michael Cunningham's novel.

Personal life
In 2008, Hulce identified as gay in an interview with Seattle Gay News. In the same interview, he took the opportunity to debunk a rumor he married a woman (supposedly an Italian artist named Cecilia Ermini) and had a daughter named Anya with her: "That information – having a wife and child – is false. In the world of the Internet, there are many falsehoods. Anyone can write stuff on Wikipedia and it doesn't have to be true. I'm comfortable among the lists [of openly gay actors] although I stopped acting about 10 years ago."

Filmography

Film

Television

Theater

Sources:

References

External links

1953 births
American male film actors
American male voice actors
American male stage actors
American people of Dutch descent
American people of English descent
American people of German descent
American people of Irish descent
American theatre managers and producers
David di Donatello winners
Film producers from Michigan
American gay actors
American gay musicians
LGBT people from Michigan
Living people
Male actors from Detroit
Outstanding Performance by a Supporting Actor in a Miniseries or Movie Primetime Emmy Award winners
People from Plymouth, Michigan
University of North Carolina School of the Arts alumni
20th-century American LGBT people
21st-century American LGBT people